Aëdon was in Greek mythology, the daughter of Pandareus of Ephesus. According to Homer, she was the wife of Zethus, and the mother of Itylus. Aëdon features in two different stories, one set in Thebes and one set in Western Asia Minor, both of which contain filicide and explain the origin of the nightingale, a bird in constant mourning.

Etymology 
The feminine noun  translates to 'nightingale', and has a secondary meaning of 'singer'. It shares the same root with the verb  meaning 'to sing, to chant, to praise'. This verb in turn derives from Proto-Hellenic *awéidō, which might be from a Proto-Indo-European root *h₂weyd-.

Mythology

Thebes 
Aëdon was the wife of Zethus, king of Thebes, and accidentally she ended up killing her own son Itylus, when 'madness was upon her'. Her story is evidently a very old one, as it was referenced as early as Homer in his Odyssey, when Penelope speaks to her husband Odysseus in the lines:

Eustathius of Thessalonica and other scholiasts explain that Aëdon was envious of her sister-in-law, Amphion's wife Niobe, who had fourteen kids (seven sons and seven daughters) opposed to her single one. Itylus however got along with his cousins, and often slept with them, in particular with Amaleus, Amphion and Niobe's firstborn. One day, Aëdon instructed Itylus to sleep in the innermost position of the bed that night. However Itylus forgot his mother's words, and so when Aëdon entered the bedroom with a knife at hand intending to kill Amaleus in his sleep, she killed her own son. Alternatively Aëdon could not tell who was which in the darkness. She mourned her only son greatly, and thus Zeus, the father of Amphion and Zethus, transformed her into a nightingale when Zethus began to hunt her down following Itylus's murder. A Homeric scholiast attributed the story of Aëdon killing her son in her effort to murder Niobe's to Pherecydes, a historian who lived during the fifth century BC.

In yet another version, Aëdon was married to Zetes, one of the sons of the north wind god Boreas (perhaps a mixing up of the names Zethus and Zetes, as Zetes is otherwise unrelated to the story). Aëdon began suspecting that Zetes had fallen in love with a hamadryad nymph, and further suspected that their son Aëtylus/Actylus was helping his father carry out the affair and covering him. In anger, Aëdon killed her son. In pity, Aphrodite changed the mother into a nightingale, which to this day mourns for her child.

It has been argued that Penelope chooses to mention Aëdon's story is because she is indirectly indicating her own desire to protect her son Telemachus, himself an only child who must hold his own against numerous male rivals and now as a grown-up acts independently of her like Itylus ignored his mother's orders, against danger.

Anatolia 
According to a later tradition preserved in Antoninus Liberalis, Aëdon is instead the daughter of Pandareus and the wife of Polytechnus, an artist of Colophon. The couple boasted that they loved each other more than Hera and Zeus. Hera sent Eris to cause trouble between the two of them. Polytechnus was then making a chair, and Aëdon a piece of embroidery, and they agreed that whoever should finish the work first should receive from the other a female slave as the prize. Polytechnos was furious when Aëdon (with Hera's help) won.  He went to Aëdon's father, and pretending that his wife wished to see her sister Chelidon, he took her with him. On his way home he raped her, dressed her in slave's attire, commanded her to silence, and gave her to his wife as the promised prize. After some time Chelidonis, believing herself unobserved, lamented her own fate, but she was overheard by Aëdon, and the two sisters conspired against Polytechnus for revenge. They murdered Polytechnos' son Itys and served him up as a meal to his father.

Aëdon then fled with Chelidon to her father, who, when Polytechnos came in pursuit of his wife, had him bound, smeared with honey, and exposed to the insects. Aëdon now took pity upon the sufferings of her husband, and when her relations were on the point of killing her for this weakness, Zeus changed Polytechnos into a woodpecker, the brother of Aëdon into a whoop, her father into a sea-eagle, her mother into a kingfisher, Chelidon into a swallow, and Aëdon herself into a nightingale. This myth seems to have originated in mere etymologies, and is of the same class as that about Philomela and Procne.

See also 

 Harpalyce
 Ino
 Lamia
 Medea

Notes

References 
 
 Antoninus Liberalis, The Metamorphoses of Antoninus Liberalis translated by Francis Celoria (Routledge 1992). Online version at the Topos Text Project.
  Online version at Internet Archive.
 
 
 
 Homer, The Odyssey with an English Translation by A.T. Murray, PH.D. in two volumes. Cambridge, MA., Harvard University Press; London, William Heinemann, Ltd. 1919. . Online version at the Perseus Digital Library. Greek text available from the same website.
 
  Online version at Perseus.tufts project.
 
 

Metamorphoses into birds in Greek mythology
Women in Greek mythology
Anatolian characters in Greek mythology
Deeds of Zeus
Textiles in folklore
Deeds of Hera
Filicides
Deeds of Aphrodite
Boeotian mythology